

Events
 On 9 July 2008, South China goalkeeper Zhang Chunhui was sentenced imprisonment for 8 months due to inflicting grievous bodily harm upon another person. He injured a 17-year-old boy in Causeway Bay on 19 December 2008.
 On 14 July 2008, South China started their training for preparing the 2008-09 season.
 On 6 September 2008, South China kicked off the season by drawing 1-1 with Citizen in Hong Kong Stadium.
 On 17 September 2008, head coach Tsang Wai Chung quit the position due to health reason. He subsequently became an advisor for the team. Before this, he only led the team for one competitive match. Assistant coach Liu Chun Fai was appointed to be the caretaker of the team.
 On 20 September 2008, South China beat Tuen Mun Progoal by 9-0, which was the team's first win of the season and is currently the biggest win difference in the current league season.
 On 24 September 2008, Liu Chun Fai was officially appointed to be the head coach of the team.
 On 3 December 2008, Kim Pan-Gon was officially appointed to be the manager of the team.

Transfers

In
 Liang Zicheng (梁子成) from Rangers (return from loan)
 Au Yeung Yiu Chung (歐陽耀沖) from Workable
 Lo Chun Kit (盧俊傑) from Eastern
 Chan Siu Ki (陳肇麒) from Kitchee
 Lin Junsheng (林俊生) from Kitchee
 Vandré Monteiro (蒙迪路) from Happy Valley
 Poon Yiu Cheuk (潘耀焯) from Happy Valley
 Li Weijun (李偉軍) from Anhui Jiufang (Chinese Football Association Jia League)
 Dame Dieng (戴恩) from ASC Diaraf (Senegal Premier League)
 Filipe (菲立) from Sporting C. de Pombal (Portuguese Second Division Serie C)
 Maxwell (free transfer)
 Ho Kwok Chuen from TSW Pegasus (loan)
 Sidraílson from Santa Cruz (Brazilian Pernambuco Football Championship Série A1) (loan)
 Kim Yeon-Gun from Seongnam Ilhwa Chunma (K-League)
 Wong Chin Hung from TSW Pegasus (return from loan)
 Cacá from Universidad L.P. (Segunda División B Groups 1-4)
 Fernando from Independente (Campeonato Paulista de Futebol - Série A3)
 Lee Wai Lun from Convoy Sun Hei
 Liu Songwei (free transfer)

Out
 Sidrailson to Santa Cruz (return from loan)
 Chung Ho Yin to Eastern
 Maxwell (contract terminated)
 Itaparica to TSW Pegasus (loan)
 Yeung Ching Kwong to TSW Pegasus (loan)
 Cheng Siu Wai to TSW Pegasus (loan)
 Yip Chi Ho to TSW Pegasus (loan)
 Deng Jinghuang to TSW Pegasus (loan)
 Lin Junsheng to TSW Pegasus (loan)
 Lai Man Fei to TSW Pegasus (loan)
 Chan Ka Chun to TSW Pegasus (loan)
 Cheng King Ho to TSW Pegasus (loan)
 Filipe (菲立) (unsuccessful trial)
 Dame Dieng (戴恩) (unsuccessful trial)
 Wong Chin Hung to TSW Pegasus (loan)
 Li Weijun (released) 
 Vandré Monteiro (released) 
 Maxwell to Al-Ittifaq (Bahraini Premier League)

Pre-season friendlies & Warm-up Matches

HKFA Fourway Challenge Cup 7-A-Side Competition

Coolpoint Ventilation First Division League

Note 1: Due to waterlogged pitch at the stadium, the match was postponed from 5 October to 8 October.
Note 2: Despite TSW Pegasus won by 3-2, the team used more than the allowed maximum of 6 foreign players at a time during the match. As a result, TSW Pegasus was sentenced a 0-3 loss and penalized for HK$10,000.
Note 3: For the consideration of the maintaining the pitch quality, the match was postponed from 29 March to 30 March.

HKFA Eisiti Senior Shield

League Cup

HKFA Sheffield United FA Cup

Note * : The match was postponed from 24 May due to weather condition.

AFC Cup

Squad statistics

Statistics accurate as of match played on 23 June 2009
1. Wong Chin Hung was on loan at TSW Pegasus from 23 September 2008 to 15 January 2009.
2. Ho Kwok Chuen joined the team on loan from TSW Pegasus since 23 September 2008.
3. Sidraílson rejoined the team in September 2008.
4. Li Weijun, Monteiro and Maxwell left the club in early January 2009.
5. Kim Yeon-Gun joined the team in January 2009.
6. Li Zicheng was not registered for this season until January 2009.
7. Cacá and Fernando joined the club on 23 January 2009.
8. Lee Wai Lun joined the club on 24 January 2009.
9. Liu Songwei joined the club in February 2009.
10. Leung Hinson was promoted from youth team in February 2009.
11. Players not registered in the AFC Cup are indicated by NA.

References

South China AA seasons
South China Aa